"So Nice" is a song by English musician James Cottriall, from his first studio album Sincerely Me. It was released in Austria as a digital download on 6 August 2010. It entered the Austrian Singles Chart at number 24. The song was written by James Cottriall and produced by Gwenael Damman.

Track listing
 Digital download
 "So Nice" - 3:21
 "So Nice" (Live Acoustic Demo) - 3:38
 "Unbreakable" (Live Acoustic Demo) - 2:59

Credits and personnel
 Lead vocals – James Cottriall
 Producer – Gwenael Damman
 Lyrics – James Cottriall
 Label: Pate Records

Chart performance

Release history

References

2010 singles
James Cottriall songs
2010 songs